Bargajwa is a village in West Champaran district in the Indian state of Bihar.

Demographics
 India census, Bargajwa had a population of 3463 in 705 households. Males constitute 52.95% of the population and females 47%. Bargajwa has an average literacy rate of 41.75%, lower than the national average of 74%: male literacy is 63.34%, and female literacy is 36.65%. In Bargajwa, 19.17% of the population is under 6 years of age.

References

Villages in West Champaran district